Yarraquin or Yarraquin Station is a pastoral lease that currently operates as a cattle station and had previously operated as a sheep station.

It adjoins Cogla Downs Station.

The property has two homesteads, the newer of which is a modern five bedroom, two bathroom home. When placed on the market in 2012 the property was running 600 head of cattle.

John Herbert Butcher, who owned Yarraquin in 1929, died the same year. The property was retained by the Butcher family who also owned Meeberrie and Nangetty Station. Charles John Butcher, who part owned the property, died in 1931 after falling under the wheel of a wool wagon.

Leslie Keamy, the prominent merino stud breeder and owner of Cardo Station, once held an interest in Yarraquin and Austin Downs Station.

See also
List of ranches and stations

References

Pastoral leases in Western Australia
Stations (Australian agriculture)
Mid West (Western Australia)